James Ralph "Shug" Jordan (September 25, 1910 – July 17, 1980) was an American football, basketball, and baseball player and coach of football and basketball.  He served as the head football coach at Auburn University from 1951 to 1975, where he compiled a record of 176–83–6.  He has the most wins of any coach in Auburn Tigers football history.  Jordan's 1957 Auburn squad went undefeated with a record of 10–0 and was named the national champion by the Associated Press.  Jordan was also the head men's basketball coach at Auburn (1933–1942, 1945–1946) and at the University of Georgia (1946–1950), tallying a career college basketball record of 136–103.  During his time coaching basketball, he also served as an assistant football coach at the two schools.  Auburn's Jordan–Hare Stadium was renamed in Jordan's honor in 1973.  Jordan was inducted into the College Football Hall of Fame as a coach in 1982.

Early years and playing career
Born in Selma, Alabama, Jordan was nicknamed "Shug" as a child because of his love for sorghum sugar cane.  A 1932 graduate of Auburn, he lettered in football, basketball, and baseball and was voted the Most Outstanding Athlete in 1932, awarded the Porter Loving Cup.  Jordan was initiated into Theta Chi Fraternity at Auburn, and he started the Delta Beta chapter of Theta Chi at the University of Georgia.

Early coaching career
After graduation, Jordan became the head basketball coach and an assistant football coach at Auburn. In ten seasons (1933–1942, 1945–1946) as the head coach of the Auburn Tigers men's basketball team, he compiled a record of 95–77.  Jordan also compiled 45 wins as head basketball coach at Georgia.  In addition to having the most wins by a football coach in Auburn history, Jordan ranks fifth in wins among Tigers basketball coaches.

Military service in World War II
During World War II, Jordan fought in four major invasions as a United States Army officer.  He saw action in North Africa and Sicily before being wounded in the invasion of Normandy and receiving a Purple Heart and the Bronze Star. After recovering from his wounds, he continued action in the Pacific theater, serving at Okinawa.

Head football coaching career
Prior to being hired as Auburn's head football coach in 1951, Jordan spent one season as an assistant coach of the Miami Seahawks of the All-America Football Conference in 1946, and then four years as an assistant at the University of Georgia.  When he became head football coach at Auburn, he retained assistants Shot Senn (linemen), Joel Eaves (defensive ends), and Dick McGowen as head freshmen team coach, all former Auburn players who had assisted Jordan's predecessor, Earl Brown.  Jordan also hired George L. "Buck" Bradberry (defensive backfield), Homer Hobbs (assistant line), Gene Lorendo (offensive ends), all former Georgia players, and Charlie Waller (offensive backfield). McGowen also served as Auburn's head baseball coach from 1951 to 1957. By 1957 Jordan led Auburn to the Southeastern Conference title and AP national championship.

In 1971, Jordan coached quarterback Pat Sullivan to the Heisman Trophy. The next year, Jordan's Tigers upset heavily favored, arch-rival Alabama in the Iron Bowl, a victory which became known as Punt Bama Punt. In 1973, the university renamed Cliff Hare Stadium as Jordan–Hare Stadium in Jordan's honor, the first stadium in the United States to be named for an active coach. Reflecting Auburn's rise to national prominence under his watch, the stadium's capacity more than tripled during his tenure, from 21,600 when he returned to the Plains in 1951 to 61,261 when he retired.  When Jordan retired after the 1975 season, he had amassed a record of 176–83–6 for a .675 winning percentage.

Death
Jordan died on July 17, 1980, at his home in Auburn, Alabama after a four-month fight with leukemia.

Personal life
Jordan met Evelyn Walker (1913–2011), a native of Augusta, Georgia, and a student at the University of South Carolina, when Jordan accompanied the Auburn University basketball team to a tournament there in 1934.  Jordan and Walker married in 1937 and were the parents of three children.  Evelyn Walker Jordan served as a Panhellenic advisor on the Auburn campus and became a licensed couples counsellor.

Head coaching record

Football

Basketball

Honors and awards
 Alabama Sports Hall of Fame (1969)
 Alabama Academy of Honor (1972)
 National Football Foundation Hall of Fame (1982)
 Senior Bowl Hall of Fame (1993)

References

External links
 
 

1910 births
1980 deaths
United States Army personnel of World War II
American football centers
American men's basketball players
Auburn Tigers baseball players
Auburn Tigers football coaches
Auburn Tigers football players
Auburn Tigers men's basketball coaches
Auburn Tigers men's basketball players
Baseball pitchers
Basketball coaches from Alabama
Basketball players from Alabama
Coaches of American football from Alabama
College Football Hall of Fame inductees
Deaths from cancer in Alabama
Deaths from leukemia
Georgia Bulldogs basketball coaches
Georgia Bulldogs football coaches
Guards (basketball)
Miami Seahawks coaches
Players of American football from Alabama
Sportspeople from Selma, Alabama
United States Army officers